German XX. Corps (XX. Armeekorps) was a corps in the German Army during World War II.

Commanders

 Infantry General (General der Infanterie) Friedrich Materna, October 1940 – 10 September 1942
 Artillery General (General der Artillerie) Rudolf Freiherr von Roman, 10 September 1942 – 14 February 1943
 Infantry General (General der Infanterie) Erwin Vierow, 14 February – 10 March 1943
 Artillery General (General der Artillerie) Rudolf Freiherr von Roman, 10 March – December 1943
 Infantry General (General der Infanterie) Edgar Röhricht, December 1943 – January 1944
 Artillery General (General der Artillerie) Rudolf Freiherr von Roman, January – 1 April 1945
 Cavalry General (General der Kavallerie) Carl-Erik Koehler, 1 April – 8 May 1945

Area of operations
 Poland – October 1940 – June 1941
 Eastern Front, Central sector – June 1941 – April 1945
 Central Germany – April – May 1945

See also
 List of German corps in World War II

External links

Army,20
Military units and formations established in 1940
Military units and formations disestablished in 1945